Golf competitions at the 2019 Southeast Asian Games in the Philippines were held at the Luisita Golf and Country Club in Tarlac City from 4 to 8 December 2019.

Medal summary

Medal table

Medalists

References

External links
 

2019
2019 Southeast Asian Games
2019 Southeast Asian Games events
Southeast Asian Games